Rosemary Adey, OAM (29 January 1933 – 1 October 2013) was an Australian softball player and sports administrator.

Adey represented both Australia and South Australia in Softball where she was vice-captain of the SA Open Women's Softball Team (1955–56), Captain (1957–60), and coach (1961–63). She was selected in a secondary Australian Squad as captain in 1953 and debuted internationally in 1954 during a test series against New Zealand and was selected in the Australian team to play South Africa in 1960. Her onfield specialisation was at 1st base and she played a crucial role as a powerful batter.

After her playing days, Adey continued to contribute to Softball by acting as Softball SA Treasurer, Vice President and President, Softball Australia-Vice President and President and internationally as International Softball Federation-Vice President. In November 2001, she retired her position on the ISF Board after 51 years of service. Softball Australia named an annually awarded medal, "The Rookie of the Year", in her honour.

Death
She died in Adelaide, South Australia on 1 October 2013, aged 80, following a long illness.

Honours
 South Australia Sportswoman of the year 1957
 Softball SA Life Member 1976 
 Medal of the Order of Australia (OAM) 1987
 Softball Australia Life Member 1989
 Softball Australia Hall of Fame 1991
 International Softball Federation Hall of Fame 1997
 Softball SA Hall of Fame 2009

References

1933 births
2013 deaths
Australian softball players
Australian softball coaches
Sportswomen from South Australia
Sportspeople from Adelaide
Members of the Order of Australia